Coedydd Capel Dyddgen is a Site of Special Scientific Interest in Carmarthen & Dinefwr,  Wales.

Coedydd Capel Dyddgen is a mosaic of Ash-Hazel woodland, scrub and grassland. The site is important for bats, particularly Rhinolophus ferrumequinum (Greater Horseshoe bat) that use the large cave Ogof Capel Dyddgen and the adjoining woodland and pasture provide important feeding areas. Muscardinus avellanarius (Common dormouse) and several noteworthy invertebrates also inhabit the site.

See also
List of Sites of Special Scientific Interest in Carmarthen & Dinefwr

References

Sites of Special Scientific Interest in Carmarthen & Dinefwr